Dirk Kuijt (anglicised to Kuyt, ; born 22 July 1980) is a Dutch former professional footballer and was the head coach of Eerste Divisie side ADO Den Haag. Originally starting out as a striker, he played much of his career as a winger.

Kuyt began his professional career with Utrecht in 1998 and quickly became part of its first team. He spent five years at the club, and in his final season he won his first senior honour, the KNVB Cup, and was chosen as the season's Dutch Golden Shoe Winner. Following this, he left Utrecht in a €1 million transfer to Feyenoord. He became the club captain in 2005 and was a prolific goalscorer at the Rotterdam club; he was the club's top scorer for three consecutive seasons, the top goalscorer in the 2004–05 Eredivisie season, and the 2005–06 Dutch Footballer of the Year. Kuyt missed only five games over seven seasons from 1999 until 2006 and appeared in 179 consecutive matches between 2001 and 2006, striking up a fruitful partnership with fellow Feyenoord teammate Salomon Kalou.

He left Feyenoord after three years, having scored 71 league goals in 101 appearances, and joined Premier League side Liverpool for £10 million. He scored in the UEFA Champions League final which Liverpool lost against Milan. He scored several important goals for Liverpool elsewhere, including seven goals in the 2007–08 Champions League, including a goal in the quarter-final against Arsenal at Emirates Stadium and in the semi-final against Chelsea, and two penalty kicks against Everton in the derby the same season. He scored his first hat-trick for Liverpool against Manchester United in March 2011. After coming on as a substitute, his extra time goal at Wembley for Liverpool against Cardiff City in the 2012 League Cup Final helped win the trophy for Liverpool, and was also his only trophy as a Liverpool player.

Kuyt played for the   Netherlands from 2004 to 2014. He represented the nation at five major international tournaments, the 2006, 2010, and 2014 FIFA World Cups and the 2008 and 2012 UEFA European Championships. 

Kuyt announced his retirement from football in 2017, having scored a hat-trick in the last game of the season to secure Feyenoord their first title since 1999 three days earlier. He came out the following April, to help out Quick Boys, where he already was the assistant-manager, to fix their shortage on strikers for the remainder of the season.

Early life
Kuyt is the third of four children. His father was a fisherman and he has stated that if he would not have found a career in football he probably would have followed his father into the family business. He grew up in the fishing town of Katwijk aan Zee.

Kuyt's football career began when he joined the local amateur team Quick Boys at age five. He broke into the first team in March 1998, playing the last six games of the season in the Hoofdklasse, and catching the eye of Eredivisie club Utrecht. Kuyt still regularly visits Katwijk and his old club Quick Boys, which benefited from a £300,000 windfall as a result of the player's move to Liverpool.

Club career

Utrecht

Kuyt signed professionally for Utrecht that summer, aged 18, and immediately established himself in the first team. Sometimes, he played as striker, however he was more often than not playing as a winger, as the side preferred to play Montenegrin Igor Gluščević up front.

This continued until the 2002–03 season when Foeke Booy was installed as the club's new manager. Booy played Kuyt as a striker / attacking midfielder (behind the striker) for the entire season, and Kuyt repaid him with 20 league goals. Utrecht also reached the KNVB Cup final, where it met Feyenoord. Although the club was an underdog, Utrecht comfortably won the cup 4–1, with Kuyt scoring one and being given the man of the match award. At the end of the season, Kuyt completed a €1 million move to Feyenoord, where he replaced the out-going Pierre van Hooijdonk.

Feyenoord

At Feyenoord, Kuyt immediately became a fans' favourite with his continued goal scoring success. His first season saw him net another 20 league goals. The opening game of the 2004–05 season marked Kuyt's first ever hat-trick against De Graafschap. He later went on to score three in the 6–3 victory against ADO Den Haag and ended the season as the Eredivisie's top scorer with 29 goals, a career high.

In 2005, Kuyt was handed the Feyenoord club captaincy and went on to have a third successful season with the club, scoring 25 goals in all competitions. He formed a strong partnership with Salomon Kalou, with the duo nicknamed "K2".

Over the summer of 2006, Kuyt was again linked with moves to many top English clubs, most notably Liverpool and Newcastle United. Rumours began in May, with Kuyt stating, "I am happy at Feyenoord but I would like to play in the Premier League." Kuyt completed a move to Liverpool on 18 August for an undisclosed fee.

Kuyt missed only five games over seven seasons from 1999 until 2006, making 233 appearances. Between March 2001 and April 2006, he played 179 consecutive matches.

Liverpool

2006–07 season

Upon joining Liverpool, Kuyt stated, "I only wanted to leave Feyenoord for a really big club, and that is what Liverpool are. They are a fantastic big club and it will be a real pleasure to play here."

Kuyt made his Liverpool debut as a substitute against West Ham United on 26 August 2006. His first start came against PSV in the UEFA Champions League, immediately receiving praise for the new defensive approach by a striker. In his third start for the club, Kuyt scored his first Liverpool goal in a Premier League fixture against Newcastle United at Anfield, and followed up with another against Tottenham Hotspur in the next game. He scored his third goal for Liverpool – with his father watching the game at Anfield – contributing to Liverpool's 3–1 win over Aston Villa. Two weeks later, he bagged a brace as the only scorer in the Reds' 2–0 victory against Reading.

Kuyt won much praise for his early performances, with the Daily Mirror writing, "The Dutch striker has the look of a cult hero in the making," and The People reporting that he is "propelling himself towards iconic status". One of the reasons for his early popularity was his post-match courtesy to the fans; after each match, he would walk to every corner of the ground and applaud the Liverpool supporters.

On 20 January 2007, Kuyt opened the scoring against Chelsea after only 4 minutes as Liverpool went on to defeat the champions 2–0, marking the first time Rafael Benítez had defeated José Mourinho in the Premier League. It was also the first goal scored by Liverpool against a top four club in the league in the 2006–07 season. Kuyt moved his league-goal tally into double figures by scoring the first goal in the game against West Ham on 30 January 2007, opening the scoring in a 2–1 away win at Upton Park.

Kuyt played a key part in Liverpool's penalty shoot-out win over Chelsea in the semi-finals of the 2006–07 Champions League. In extra-time, he had a goal disallowed for offside from Xabi Alonso's strike. Kuyt also scored the winning kick in the shoot-out, and scored a consolation goal in the club's 2–1 defeat to Milan in the final.

2007–08 season

Kuyt scored his first goals of the 2007–08 season in Liverpool's 4–0 Champions League qualifying victory over Toulouse on 28 August 2007. He scored two penalties against Everton in the Merseyside derby to give Liverpool a 2–1 win. His third and final league goal of the season came in a 3–0 away win over Newcastle in November 2007; Kuyt would not score another league goal until October 2008. In all competitions, he failed to score in 13 matches for Liverpool before netting against Barnsley in the fifth round of the FA Cup.

On 19 February 2008, Kuyt scored the first goal in the first leg of the round of 16 of the Champions League against favourites Internazionale in a 2–0 win.

Starting in early 2008, Kuyt began to be employed as a right winger and set up two of Fernando Torres' goals against West Ham in March. He adapted to this new role and soon regained his overall form, playing himself into the starting XI again after putting on various vital team performances. On 2 April 2008, Kuyt scored an equalising goal against Arsenal at Emirates Stadium.

On 22 April 2008, in the first leg of the Champions League all-English semi-final against Chelsea at Anfield, Kuyt scored the opening goal just before half time.

2008–09 season
Kuyt scored a late extra time goal against Standard Liège in the 2008–09 Champions League qualifying match to put Liverpool through to the group stages of the competition. In his next game, a 2–1 win in the Premier League against Manchester United, he assisted fellow countryman Ryan Babel's winning goal.

Kuyt's goals at vital moments in important games, such as the last minute strike against Standard Liège, an injury time winner against Manchester City on 5 October 2008 and twice in Liverpool's 3–2 comeback win over Wigan Athletic on 18 October 2008, led to his reputation as a "Big Game Player".

The 2008–09 season saw Kuyt score 15 goals, his best return for the club, as they finished runner-up in the Premier League

2009–10 season

As a result of heavy injuries sustained by the Liverpool squad, Kuyt often found himself playing a central striker role. He scored against Stoke City and Burnley in two home 4–0 triumphs. He also scored the winning goal in Liverpool's opening Champions League group game against Hungarian team Debrecen in a 1–0 win. Kuyt's goal against Debrecen means only Ian Rush, Mohammed Salah and Steven Gerrard have scored more goals for the club in the European Cup/UEFA Champions League. It was his 12th goal in Europe's premier club competition.
Kuyt scored his fourth league goal of the season in a 2–0 win against Everton at Goodison Park, in the Merseyside derby. He took his season's goal tally to six, his fifth in the league, by scoring in a 2–1 Premier League loss to Arsenal at Anfield. On 20 January, Kuyt scored both goals at Anfield against Spurs in a 2–0 victory and a week later, scored the opener against Bolton Wanderers.

On 6 February, Kuyt scored his fourth Merseyside derby goal with a header from a corner against Everton in the 55th minute, bringing his tally of goals for Liverpool to 50 in all competitions. He was also awarded man of the match for this game, which Liverpool won 1–0. On 8 April, he scored his 51st goal for Liverpool with a header in the UEFA Europa League against Benfica. The goal, a header direct from a corner, was originally disallowed by the linesmen for offside, but after some heavy protests by the Liverpool players and manager Rafael Benítez that a player cannot be offside directly from a corner, the referee changed his mind and allowed the goal. Kuyt played in his 200th competitive game for Liverpool, against Hull City on the final day of Liverpool's season.

2010–11 season

Kuyt featured in Liverpool's opening game of the season against Arsenal at Anfield, the game finishing 1–1 and both teams finishing with ten men. On 23 August, he played in the team's heavy defeat to Manchester City at the City of Manchester Stadium and featured in Liverpool's Europa League qualifier against Trabzonspor, netting the winning goal in a 2–1 win three days later. On 29 August, he played in Liverpool's 1–0 win against West Bromwich Albion at Anfield. An injury to his shoulder during a Netherlands training session forced Kuyt out for a month, but returned a week earlier than expected, celebrating by scoring his second goal of the season against Sunderland at Anfield on 25 September in a 2–2 draw.

Kuyt scored a penalty in Liverpool's 3–0 win against West Ham. On 16 January 2011, he scored another penalty to draw Liverpool level 2–2 against Everton, after Tim Howard had fouled Maxi Rodríguez. On 24 February, he headed in from a corner against Sparta Prague to put Liverpool through to the last 16 of the Europa League, winning 1–0 on the night at Anfield and 1–0 on aggregate.

On 6 March, Kuyt scored his first Premier League hat-trick for Liverpool in a 3–1 win at Anfield against the club's biggest rival, Manchester United. Kuyt added another goal to his Liverpool tally on 20 March 2011 with a well placed penalty kick against Sunderland, and scored his 11th goal of the season against Manchester City in a 3–0 win. On 15 April, Kuyt signed a contract extension to keep him at the club until the summer of 2013.

On 17 April, Kuyt scored a 102nd-minute penalty kick to seal a late draw against Arsenal after Robin van Persie had scored a penalty in the 98th minute. The match finished 1–1. On 23 April, Kuyt scored a 23-minute goal against Birmingham City after a tussle inside the box, the match ended 5–0 to Liverpool. On 1 May, Kuyt scored a 59-minute penalty kick against Newcastle United for the second goal in a 3–0 win. On 9 May 2011, he became the first Liverpool player since John Aldridge, in over two decades to score in five consecutive games, after his 16th-minute goal against Fulham that led to a 5–2 victory. Kuyt finished the season as Liverpool's top goal scorer scoring 13 league goals, finishing with a total of 15, equalling his best return for the club in a season.

2011–12 season

On 21 September 2011, Kuyt scored his first goal of the season in a 2–1 win against Brighton & Hove Albion in the 83rd minute in the third round of the League Cup. He did not score for the rest of 2011, missing a chance to get his 50th league goal for the club on 1 October 2011 with a saved penalty against Everton, a game Liverpool went on to win 2–0. On 8 October, Kuyt was announced as having taken up an advisory role with his first club in football, Quick Boys. Kuyt's next goal was a crucial 88th-minute winner in a 2–1 victory against Manchester United in the fourth round of the FA Cup on 28 January 2012. He went on to score his 50th league goal for Liverpool the following week in a 3–0 victory over Wolverhampton Wanderers, becoming only the fifth player to score 50 or more goals for Liverpool in the Premier League.

After coming on as a substitute, Kuyt scored Liverpool's second goal in the 2012 League Cup final against Cardiff City on 26 February; the game finished 2–2 after extra-time, with Liverpool winning after a penalty shoot-out, Kuyt converting his kick.

Fenerbahçe

On 3 June 2012, Fenerbahçe declared on its official website that Kuyt had signed with the club on a three-year contract. The transfer fee was €1 million, the release clause in his contract. Kuyt initially earned €2.85 million per season in addition to a match bonus of €17,500.
He scored his first Fenerbahçe goal in a Champions League qualifier against Romanian side Vaslui in a 4–1 win, netting the second and third goals.
Kuyt also scored on his league debut at league newcomers Elazigspor on 18 August 2012, as the game ended in a 1–1 draw. In the match against Gaziantepspor, Kuyt scored his 250th goal in his career, including international goals.

Return to Feyenoord
In April 2015, Kuyt signed a one-year contract to rejoin his former club Feyenoord for the 2015–16 season.

In the 2016–17 season Kuyt led his team to first Eredivisie title since 1999. On the final day of the season he scored a hat-trick to clinch the title. Three days later, on 17 May, Kuyt announced his retirement from football.

International career

When Marco van Basten took over as coach of the Dutch national team he dropped many established players, including strikers Roy Makaay and Patrick Kluivert. Kuyt benefitted as in September 2004 he made his international debut in Van Basten's first game against Liechtenstein. He became a permanent fixture in the Dutch squad, making the starting line-up for 11 of the Netherlands' 12 2006 FIFA World Cup qualification matches.
Kuyt usually wore the number 7 jersey when representing his country, with exception of UEFA Euro 2008, where he wore number 18, the same number he then wore at his club Liverpool.

2006 World Cup
At the 2006 World Cup, Kuyt found himself dropped to the substitutes' bench. Although he made an appearance as a 69th-minute replacement in the first match against Serbia and Montenegro, he sat out the entire second game. With the team having already qualified for the next round, Van Basten decided to rest many of his first-choice players for the final group stage match against Argentina, and Kuyt was handed a start in the right wing position.

For the Netherlands' round of 16 tie against Portugal, Kuyt was selected to start ahead of regular first-choice striker Ruud van Nistelrooy. However, Kuyt did not have a good game and the Netherlands eventually lost 1–0 in a game that was more notable for its record breaking disciplinary record (4 red cards and 16 yellow cards).

Euro 2008
Kuyt was selected for the Dutch squad for Euro 2008. On 9 June, he played in their opening Group C match, a 3–0 victory over world champions Italy, assisting two goals, his most notable contribution being the header that provided the link between Giovanni van Bronckhorst's crossfield pass and Wesley Sneijder's goal to make the score 2–0 on 31 minutes. On 13 June, Kuyt scored his team's second goal in the next game of Group C, a 4–1 victory over 2006 World Cup finalists France, opening the scoring with a ninth-minute header from a corner, taking his tally of international goals to eight. During Euro 2008, Kuyt was utilised as a winger, partnering Sneijder and Rafael van der Vaart in the midfield due to the team's change of formation from 4–3–3/4–4–2 to 4–2–3–1.

2010 World Cup

Kuyt scored three goals in the 2010 World Cup qualifiers. During a friendly against England, he opened the scoring less than ten minutes after kick-off, pouncing on Rio Ferdinand's poor back pass.

Kuyt was included in the Netherlands' preliminary squad for the 2010 World Cup in South Africa. On 27 May 2010, the Netherlands manager Bert van Marwijk announced that the player would be part of the final squad of 23 participating in the competition.

At the finals, Kuyt scored the Netherlands' second goal in the 85th minute of their 2–0 win over Denmark in its opening group match, slotting in the rebound after Eljero Elia's shot hit the post. In the quarter-final match on 2 July against Brazil, Kuyt flicked a corner on to Wesley Sneijder, who headed the ball into the net to give the Dutch a 2–1 win. Kuyt also assisted the goal scored by Arjen Robben against Uruguay in the semi-finals.

Kuyt started all seven matches for the national team, which finished as runners-up to Spain, and finished the tournament with one goal and three assists.

Euro 2012

On 2 September 2010, Kuyt scored a penalty as the Netherlands began its Euro 2012 qualifying campaign with a 5–0 away win against San Marino.
On 12 October 2010, Kuyt injured his ankle in the Netherlands' fourth qualifier against Sweden and was out of action for four weeks with the injury. On 25 March 2011, Kuyt scored the Netherlands' third goal in a 4–0 win against Hungary and, four days later, he scored twice in a 5–3 win against the same opponents. Kuyt scored the fourth goal in the Netherlands' record 11–0 win over San Marino. Kuyt headed in his seventh international goal of 2011 in a 3–2 loss against Sweden. Despite being an undisputed starter in the qualifying campaign, Kuyt lost his spot during Euro 2012, with Arjen Robben preferred on the right wing and Ibrahim Affelay on the left. He made two brief appearances as a substitute for Gregory van der Wiel against Denmark in the 85th minute and for Robben against Germany in the 83rd minute.

2014 World Cup
After Bert van Marwijk resigned as manager of the Netherlands in June 2012, Kuyt was made vice-captain behind Wesley Sneijder by new coach Louis van Gaal. Despite being vice-captain, he did not feature in any games until the match against Andorra on 12 October replacing Jermain Lens as a substitute in the 71st minute. After Kevin Strootman was substituted off four minutes later, Kuyt took the captain's armband. On 14 November, he played the full 90 minutes in a friendly against Germany as a striker, wearing the captain's armband.

Kuyt won his 100th cap in the Netherlands' round of 16 victory over Mexico on 29 June 2014, making him only the seventh Dutch player to play 100 matches. He was selected to start the match in an unfamiliar left wing-back role by Van Gaal, who also positioned the 33-year-old at wingback and centre forward during the course of the match.

In the quarter-final, Kuyt scored the Netherlands' final kick in a 4–3 penalty shootout win over Costa Rica. In the semi-final, Kuyt scored the Netherlands' fourth kick in a penalty shootout against Argentina, but the Oranje went on to lose the shootout 4–2. In the third place play-off, Kuyt made his last international appearance in a 3–0 victory over Brazil, playing the full 90 minutes in the right wing-back position.

Kuyt retired from international football on 3 October 2014. "I want to be important to the Netherlands team, but the coach explained to me that he no longer has the role for me that I would prefer," Kuyt said on the Dutch FA website, knvb.de. "I'm 34 years old, then you should be honest to yourself. I didn't quite fancy investing a lot of energy in the Oranje for another two years without getting to play much. I look back with great pride on 10 wonderful years with the Dutch national team."

Managerial career
On 2 June 2022, ADO Den Haag presented Kuyt as their new head coach, with him signing a one-year contract. He was fired on 24 November 2022, after disappointing results which saw the team sitting in 17th after 16 matches.

Personal life
Kuyt's then-wife Gertrude found favour in the Dutch media for her down-to-earth attitude. She continued to work as a nurse in an old people's home after marrying Kuyt until their daughter, Noelle, was born. Kuyt and his wife went on to carry out extensive charity work off the pitch. Most notably, he and his wife set up the Dirk Kuyt Foundation to help disadvantaged children in his homeland and the developing world. One of the ways the foundation raises money is by selling DK-branded clothes.  The couple divorced in 2020.

Kuyt's father, also named Dirk, died of cancer on 29 June 2007.

Career statistics

Club

International
Source:

International goals

Managerial

Honours

Utrecht
KNVB Cup: 2002–03

Liverpool
League Cup: 2011–12
FA Cup runner-up: 2011-12
UEFA Champions League runner-up: 2006–07

Fenerbahçe
Süper Lig: 2013–14
Turkish Cup: 2012–13
Turkish Super Cup: 2014

Feyenoord
Eredivisie: 2016–17
KNVB Cup: 2015–16

Netherlands
FIFA World Cup runner-up: 2010; third place: 2014

Individual
Dutch Golden Shoe: 2003, 2006
Eredivisie Top Scorer: 2005
Dutch Footballer of the Year: 2006
FIFA World Cup top assist provider: 2010

See also
 List of footballers with 100 or more caps

References

External links

 
 The Dirk Kuyt Foundation
 
 
 Dirk Kuyt at LFChistory.net
 Dirk Kuyt at This is Anfield
 
 

1980 births
Living people
Footballers from Katwijk
Dutch footballers
Dutch football managers
Association football forwards
Quick Boys players
FC Utrecht players
Feyenoord players
Liverpool F.C. players
Fenerbahçe S.K. footballers
Eredivisie players
Premier League players
Süper Lig players
Netherlands under-21 international footballers
Netherlands international footballers
2006 FIFA World Cup players
UEFA Euro 2008 players
2010 FIFA World Cup players
UEFA Euro 2012 players
2014 FIFA World Cup players
FIFA Century Club
Dutch expatriate footballers
Dutch expatriate sportspeople in England
Dutch expatriate sportspeople in Turkey
Expatriate footballers in England
Expatriate footballers in Turkey
FA Cup Final players
ADO Den Haag managers
Eerste Divisie managers